Peter Schrock Jr. Farm is a historic building near Trenton, Ohio, listed on the National Register of Historic Places in 1984.

Historic uses 
Single Dwelling
Secondary Structure

Notes

External links
Ohio Historic Inventory

Farms on the National Register of Historic Places in Ohio
Houses in Butler County, Ohio
National Register of Historic Places in Butler County, Ohio